"I've Got to Have It" is a song written by American producer Jermaine Dupri and American rapper Nas, featuring American singer Monica for the soundtrack of the comedy film Big Momma's House. The song heavily samples Peter Gabriel's 1986 hit single "Sledgehammer". The song was released as the lead single from the soundtrack in June 2000. In the US, it peaked at number 67 on the Hot R&B/Hip-Hop Singles & Tracks. It never charted on the Billboard Hot 100.

Weekly charts

References

Monica (singer) songs
Nas songs
Jermaine Dupri songs
2000 singles
Song recordings produced by Jermaine Dupri
Songs written by Jermaine Dupri
Songs written by Nas
Songs written by Bryan-Michael Cox
Songs written by Peter Gabriel
2000 songs
So So Def Recordings singles
Funk songs